Hill & Smith PLC is a business involved in the design, manufacture and supply of products for the construction and infrastructure industries. It is listed on the London Stock Exchange and is a constituent of the FTSE 250 Index.

History
The company was founded by Edward Hill as Hill's Ironworks at Brierley Hill in 1824; Henry Smith joined the business, which became a partnership. Historic projects included fencing for Queen Victoria in 1860, ornamental gates the King Chulalongkorn of Siam in around 1900, materials for the Naval Base Simon's Town in 1910 and components for the Sydney Harbour Bridge in 1932. It was first listed on the London Stock Exchange in March 1969.

In 2005 the company bought Techspan Systems for £0.9 million, in 2012 it bought Expamet for £0.5 million and in November 2015, it bought Hull Galvanising for £15.5 million.

In 2019 the company acquired hostile vehicle mitigation (HVM) specialists ATG Access for £22.5 million.

In October 2022, it was announced Hill & Smith had acquired the US-based solar lighting company, National Signal Inc., for $25.3 million and the UK-based Widnes Galvanising Limited for £3.7 million. It changed its name from Hill & Smith Holdings plc to Hill & Smith plc on 4 November 2022.

References

External links
Official site

British companies established in 1824
Companies based in the West Midlands (county)
Manufacturing companies established in 1824
1824 establishments in England
Companies listed on the London Stock Exchange